BILS may refer to: 
 Bank Indonesia Liquidity Support, a government policy in Indonesia
 Bangladesh Institute of Labour Studies, a labour NGO in Bangladesh